The 2002 Pacific hurricane season was an above-average season which produced fifteen named storms. Eight hurricanes formed, including three Category 5 hurricanes, which tied for the most in a season with 1994 and 2018. Moreover, the season was a near-average season in terms of accumulated cyclone energy (ACE), with a total index of 125 units. The season officially began on May 15 in the East Pacific Ocean, and on June 1 in the Central Pacific and they both ended on November 30. These dates conventionally delimit the period of each year when most tropical cyclones form in the Pacific basin. However, the formation of tropical cyclones is possible at any time of the year.

Tropical activity began with the formation of Tropical Storm Alma on May 24, before it became a major hurricane. The strongest hurricane of the season, Kenna, formed on October 22 and peaked as a Category 5 hurricane two days later. June was extremely quiet with no hurricanes forming during the month. August was active with four systems developing, of which two became hurricanes. Activity decreased appreciably in September throughout November as most of the storms remained weak and short-lived. The final storm of the season, Tropical Depression Sixteen-E, dissipated on November 16, about two weeks before the official end.

Land impact was relatively significant. Kenna made landfall near Puerto Vallarta, located in the Mexican state of Jalisco on October 25, killing four people. Kenna was, at the time, the second-most powerful hurricane to ever strike the western coast of Mexico, hitting with winds of 140 mph (220 km/h), as well as the strongest landfall in terms of windspeed until Hurricane Patricia in 2015. Elsewhere, Tropical Storm Julio made landfall in Mexico, and Tropical Storm Boris dumped torrential rain along the Mexican coast, despite remaining offshore. Other storms were individually unusual. Hurricanes Elida and Hernan also reached Category 5 intensity, but neither caused any damage. Hurricane Fausto had no effect on land, but it regenerated into a weak tropical storm at an abnormally high latitude. Damage across the basin reached $101.23 million (2002 USD), while 7 people were killed by Julio and Kenna.

Seasonal summary 

The season officially began on May 15 in Eastern Pacific and on June 1 in Central Pacific; both ended on November 30. There were 16 tropical storms in the eastern Pacific Ocean in the season. Of those, eight became hurricanes, of which six became major hurricanes by reaching Category 3 or higher on the Saffir–Simpson scale. Three reached Category 5 intensity, a record shared with the 1994 season and the 2018 season. Four tropical depressions formed and dissipated before reaching the intensity of a tropical storm. In the Central Pacific Hurricane Center's area of responsibility, one tropical storm and two hurricanes formed, with one of the hurricanes intensifying into a major hurricane. In the eastern Pacific proper, the season saw below average activity in terms of the number of total storms and hurricanes, but about average activity in terms of major hurricanes. Only three systems, Tropical Storms Boris and Julio and Hurricane Kenna, had significant impact on land. Julio and Kenna caused the only two landfalls this year. Most of the season's impact, including all casualties and most of the damage, was caused by Kenna.

A moderately strong El Niño, ongoing during the season, may have contributed to the disproportionate number of major hurricanes, as well as reduced activity in the Atlantic. Also of note was an unusual gap in storm formation during the first three weeks of August in this season, historically a prime period for tropical cyclone formation.

May 15
 0700 UTC (12:00 a.m. PDT) – The Eastern Pacific hurricane season officially begins.
May 24
 1800 UTC (5 a.m.
May 26
 1200 UTC (5 a.m. PDT) – Tropical Depression One-E strengthens into Tropical Storm Alma.
May 28
 1800 UTC (5 a.m. PDT) – Tropical Storm Alma strengthens into a hurricane.
May 29
 1800 UTC (5 a.m. PDT) – Hurricane Alma reaches category 2 strength.
May 30
 0600 UTC (11 a.m. PDT) – Hurricane Alma becomes a major hurricane.
 1800 UTC (5 a.m. PDT) – Hurricane Alma weakens into a category 2 hurricane.
May 31
 0600 UTC (11 p.m. PDT) – Hurricane Alma weakens into a category 1 hurricane.
 1200 UTC (5 a.m. PDT) – Hurricane Alma weakens into a tropical storm.

June 1
 The Central Pacific hurricane season officially begins.
 0600 UTC (11 p.m. PDT) – Tropical Storm Alma weakens into a tropical depression.
 1200 UTC (5 a.m. PDT) – Tropical Depression Alma dissipates.
June 8
 1200 UTC (5 a.m.
June 9
 0000 UTC (5 p.m. PDT) – Tropical Depression Two-E strengthens into Tropical Storm Boris.
June 10
 1800 UTC (5 a.m. PDT) – Tropical Storm Boris weakens into a tropical depression.
June 11
 1800 UTC (5 a.m. PDT) – Tropical Depression Boris degenerates into a remnant low-pressure area.
June 27
 1200 UTC (5 a.m.
June 29
 0600 UTC (11 p.m. PDT) – Tropical Depression Three-E dissipates.

July 9
 1200 UTC (5 a.m.
July 12
 0600 UTC (11 p.m. PDT) – Tropical Depression Four-E strengthens into Tropical Storm Cristina.
July 15
 1200 UTC (5 a.m. PDT) – Tropical Storm Cristina weakens into a tropical depression.
July 17
 0000 UTC (5 p.m. PDT) – Tropical Depression Cristina dissipates.
July 20
 1200 UTC (5 a.m.
 1800 UTC (5 a.m. PDT) – Tropical Depression Five-E strengthens into Tropical Storm Douglas.
July 22
 0000 UTC (5 p.m. PDT) – Tropical Storm Douglas becomes a hurricane.
 1200 UTC (5 a.m. PDT) – Hurricane Douglas strengthens to become a category 2 hurricane.
July 23
 0600 UTC (11 p.m.
 1200 UTC (5 a.m. PDT) – Tropical Depression Six-E strengthens into Tropical Storm Elida.
 1800 UTC (5 a.m. PDT) – Hurricane Douglas weakens into a category 1 hurricane.

July 24
 0600 UTC (11 p.m. PDT) – Tropical Storm Elida strengthens into a hurricane.
 1200 UTC (5 a.m. PDT) – Hurricane Elida strengthens into a major hurricane, skipping category 2 status.
 1800 UTC (5 a.m. PDT) – Hurricane Elida strengthens into a category 4 hurricane.
 1800 UTC (5 a.m. PDT) – Hurricane Douglas weakens into a tropical storm.
July 25
 0600 UTC (11 p.m. PDT) – Hurricane Elida becomes the first category 5 hurricane of the season.
 1200 UTC (5 a.m. PDT) – Hurricane Elida weakens into a category 4 hurricane.
July 26
 0000 UTC (5 p.m. PDT) – Hurricane Elida weakens into a category 3 hurricane.
 0000 UTC (5 p.m. PDT) – Tropical Storm Douglas weakens into a tropical depression.
 1800 UTC (5 a.m. PDT) – Hurricane Elida weakens into a category 2 hurricane.
 1800 UTC (5 a.m. PDT) – Tropical Depression Douglas degenerates into a remnant low-pressure area.
July 27
 0600 UTC (11 p.m. PDT) – Hurricane Elida weakens into a category 1 hurricane.
 1800 UTC (5 a.m. PDT) – Hurricane Elida weakens into a tropical storm.
July 29
 1800 UTC (5 a.m. PDT) – Tropical Storm Elida weakens into a tropical depression.
July 30
 1800 UTC (5 a.m. PDT) – Tropical Depression Elida weakens into a remnant low-pressure area.

August 6
 0000 UTC (5 p.m.
August 8
 0600 UTC (11 p.m. PDT) – Tropical Depression Seven-E dissipates.
August 21
 1200 UTC (5 a.m.
August 22
 0000 UTC (5 p.m. August 21 PDT) – Tropical Depression Eight-E strengthens into Tropical Storm Fausto.
 1800 UTC (5 a.m. PDT) – Tropical Storm Fausto becomes a hurricane.
 1800 UTC (2 a.m.

August 23
 1200 UTC (5 a.m. PDT) – Hurricane Fausto becomes a category 2 hurricane.
 1800 UTC (5 a.m. PDT) – Hurricane Fausto becomes a major hurricane.
August 24
 0600 UTC (11 p.m. PDT) – Hurricane Fausto becomes a category 4 hurricane.
August 25
 0000 UTC (2 p.m. August 24 HST) – Tropical Depression One-C strengthens into a tropical storm and is named Alika.
 0600 UTC (11 p.m. PDT) – Hurricane Fausto weakens into a category 3 hurricane.
 1200 UTC (5 a.m. PDT) – Hurricane Fausto weakens into a category 2 hurricane.

August 26
 0000 UTC (5 p.m.
 0600 UTC (11 p.m. PDT) – Hurricane Fausto weakens into a category 1 hurricane.
 1200 UTC (5 a.m. PDT) – Hurricane Fausto weakens into a tropical storm.
August 27
 0000 UTC (2 p.m.
 0000 UTC (5 p.m. PDT) – Tropical Depression Nine-E strengthens into a tropical storm and is named Genevieve.
 0000 UTC (2 p.m. August 26 HST) – Tropical Storm Alika weakens into a tropical depression.
 0600 UTC (8 p.m. HST) – Tropical Depression Two-C strengthens into a tropical storm and is named Ele.

August 28
 0000 UTC (2 p.m. August 27 HST) – Tropical Storm Ele strengthens into a hurricane.
 0000 UTC (5 p.m. PDT) – Tropical Storm Fausto weakens into a tropical depression as it crosses into the Central Pacific.
 0600 UTC (8 p.m. August 27 HST) – Tropical Depression Alika dissipates.
 1200 UTC (5 a.m. PDT) – Tropical Depression Fausto degenerates into a low.
August 29
 0600 UTC (8 p.m. August 28 HST) – Hurricane Ele strengthens into a category 2 hurricane.
 1800 UTC (2 a.m. HST) – Hurricane Ele strengthens into a major hurricane.
August 30
 0000 UTC (2 p.m. August 29 HST) – Hurricane Ele moves out of the Central Pacific and into the West Pacific where the JMA takes up warning responsibility.
 0600 UTC (11 p.m.
 1200 TC (5 a.m. PDT) – Tropical Depression Ten-E strengthens into a tropical storm and is named Hernan.
 1200 UTC (5 a.m. PDT) – Tropical Storm Genevieve weakens into a tropical depression.
 1800 UTC (5 a.m.
August 31
 0600 UTC (11 p.m. PDT) – Tropical Storm Hernan becomes a hurricane.
 1200 UTC (5 a.m. PDT) – Hurricane Hernan strengthens into a category 2 hurricane.
 1800 UTC (5 a.m. PDT) – Hurricane Hernan strengthens into a major hurricane.

September 1
 0000 UTC (5 p.m. PDT) – Hurricane Hernan strengthens into a category 4 hurricane.
 0600 UTC (11 p.m. PDT) – Tropical Depression Genevieve dissipates.
 1200 UTC (5 a.m. PDT) – Hurricane Hernan strengthens into a category 5 hurricane.
 1800 UTC (5 a.m. PDT) – Tropical Depression Fausto re-strengthens into a tropical storm.

September 2
 0000 UTC (5 p.m. PDT) – Hurricane Hernan weakens into a category 4 hurricane.
 1200 UTC (5 a.m. PDT) – Hurricane Hernan weakens into a category 3 hurricane.
September 3
 0000 UTC (5 p.m. PDT) – Hurricane Hernan weakens into a category 2 hurricane.
 0600 UTC (11 p.m. PDT) – Tropical Storm Fausto is absorbed by an extratropical low.
September 4
 0000 UTC (5 p.m. PDT) – Hurricane Hernan weakens into a category 1 hurricane.
 1200 UTC (5 a.m. PDT) – Hurricane Hernan weakens into a tropical storm.
September 5
 1200 UTC (5 a.m. PDT) – Tropical Storm Hernan weakens into a tropical depression.
September 6
 0000 UTC (5 p.m.
 1800 UTC (5 a.m. PDT) – Tropical Depression Hernan weakens into a remnant low-pressure area.
September 8
 1800 UTC (5 a.m. PDT) – Tropical Depression Eleven-E weakens into a remnant low-pressure area.
September 15
 0600 UTC (11 p.m.

September 16
 0000 UTC (5 p.m. PDT) – Tropical Depression Twelve-E strengthens into a tropical storm and is named Iselle.
September 19
 1800 UTC (5 a.m. PDT) – Tropical Storm Iselle weakens into a tropical depression.
September 20
 0600 UTC (11 p.m. PDT) – Tropical Depression Iselle weakens into a remnant low-pressure area.

September 25
 0000 UTC (5 p.m.
 1200 UTC (5 a.m. PDT) – Tropical Depression Thirteen-E strengthens into a tropical storm and is named Julio.
September 26
 0000 UTC (5 p.m.
 1200 UTC (5 a.m. PDT) – Tropical Storm Julio weakens into a tropical depression.
 1800 UTC (11 a.m. PDT) – Tropical Depression Julio dissipates.

October 22
 0000 UTC (5 p.m.
 0600 UTC (11 p.m. October 21 PDT) – Tropical Depression Fourteen-E strengthens into a tropical storm and is named Kenna.
 1800 UTC (5 a.m. PDT) – Tropical Depression Fifteen-E forms in the western portion of the Eastern Pacific.
October 23
 0600 UTC (11 p.m. October 22 PDT) – Tropical Depression Fifteen-E strengthens into a tropical storm and is named Lowell.
 1800 UTC (5 a.m. PDT) – Tropical Storm Kenna strengthens into a hurricane.

October 24
 0000 UTC (5 p.m. October 23 PDT) – Hurricane Kenna strengthens into a category 2 hurricane.
 0600 UTC (11 p.m. October 23 PDT) – Hurricane Kenna strengthens into a major hurricane.
 1200 UTC (5 a.m. PDT) – Hurricane Kenna strengthens into a category 4 hurricane.
 1800 UTC (5 a.m. PDT) – Hurricane Kenna strengthens into a category 5 hurricane.
 1800 UTC (11 a.m. PDT) – Tropical Storm Lowell weakens into a tropical depression.
 1800 UTC (2 a.m. PDT) – Tropical Depression Three-C forms south of the Hawaiian Islands.

October 25
 0000 UTC (5 p.m.
 1200 UTC (5 a.m. PDT) – Hurricane Kenna weakens into a category 4 hurricane.
 1800 UTC (5 a.m. PDT) – Hurricane Kenna weakens into a category 3 hurricane.
October 26
 0000 UTC (2 p.m. October 25 HST) – Tropical Depression Three-C strengthens into a tropical storm and is named Huko.
 0000 UTC (5 p.m. PDT) – Hurricane Kenna rapidly weakens into a tropical storm over Mexico.
 0600 UTC (11 p.m. PDT) – Tropical Storm Kenna dissipates.
October 27
 1800 UTC (5 a.m. PDT) – Tropical Depression Lowell re-strengthens into a tropical storm.
October 28
 1800 UTC (5 a.m. PDT) – Tropical Storm Huko strengthens into a hurricane.
October 29
 1200 UTC (5 a.m. PDT) – Tropical Storm Lowell again weakens into a tropical depression.
October 30
 0000 UTC (2 p.m. October 29 HST) – Hurricane Huko weakens into a tropical storm.

October 31
 0000 UTC (5 p.m. PDT) – Tropical Depression Lowell dissipates.
 0600 UTC (11 p.m. October 30 HST) – Tropical Storm Huko again strengthens into a hurricane.

November 3
 0600 UTC (8 p.m. November 2 HST) – Hurricane Huko moves out of the Central Pacific Hurricane Center's Area of Responsibility.
November 14
 0000 UTC (5 p.m.
November 16
 0600 UTC (11 p.m. PDT) – Tropical Depression Sixteen-E weakens into a remnant low-pressure area.
November 30
 The Eastern and Central Pacific hurricane seasons officially ends.

Systems

Hurricane Alma 

A complex formation involving a tropical wave and a gale over the Gulf of Tehuantepec formed Tropical Depression One-E on May 24. It slowly strengthened into the first tropical storm of the season two days later. Alma then turned north, moving near the edge of a subtropical ridge over Mexico. Its rate of intensification picked up, and Alma became a hurricane on May 28. Alma reached Category 3 intensity on May 30. The hurricane began to weaken almost immediately thereafter under the influence of wind shear and cool water. Alma rapidly fell apart, and degenerated into a weak low-pressure area by June 1.

The hurricane did not impact land. A special feature about Alma was that it was one of only five Pacific major hurricanes in May.

Tropical Storm Boris 

On June 8, an area of disturbed weather that had absorbed a tropical wave spawned Tropical Depression Two-E. It became a tropical storm the next day. After peaking on June 9, with a pressure of 997 mb, steering currents collapsed and Boris stalled out in the ocean between two ridges of high pressure. Shear increased, and the cyclone weakened to a depression on June 10. The next day, Boris degenerated into a remnant low. The remnant drifted east and then southeast before dissipating on June 12.

Boris dumped heavy rains on sections of the Mexican coast. These rains damaged several homes at an unspecified location. In addition, rainfall damaged several homes in Tequila, Jalisco, but the National Hurricane Center believes that Boris likely did not cause the rain. No deaths were attributed to this storm.

Tropical Depression Three-E 

A tropical wave that crossed Central America organized and developed into a tropical depression on June 27. Contrary to forecasts, the depression did not strengthen further because of strong wind shear. By June 29, the depression had become a remnant low, which was observed as a swirl of clouds for a few more days before dissipating.

Tropical Storm Cristina 

An area of disturbed weather near Panama drifted to a location south of Puerto Ángel, Oaxaca, and organized into Tropical Depression Four-E on July 9. It moved westward through a hostile environment of strong shear. The wind shear disrupted the cyclone's convection and weakened its circulation. Despite the shear, the depression strengthened into a tropical storm early on July 12 and was named Cristina. This broke down the steering ridge, and Cristina turned to the north and peaked on July 14. Then, the wind shear won out and Cristina quickly weakened. Cristina dissipated into a swirl of clouds on July 16, without ever threatening land. No impact was reported.

Hurricane Douglas 

A tropical wave exited the west coast of Africa on July 8 and crossed the Atlantic without much development. In the Caribbean, showers increased, but wind shear prevented development. The wave crossed into the eastern Pacific on July 16, and wind shear decreased to allow the convection to organize. At that time, gradual strengthening was anticipated. The depression quickly intensified into Tropical Storm Douglas. Around that time, most of the deep convection was situated south of the atmospheric circulation. Initially expected to become a hurricane only briefly, late on July 21, the NHC reported that Douglas had become a hurricane. Upon becoming a hurricane, Douglas was situated in low wind shear environment; however, Hurricane Douglas was expected to reach cold waters in 36 hours, and thus was not predicted to become a major hurricane. Douglas held this intensity for 18 hours as it traveled westward. When Douglas weakened from its peak intensity, it had an organized cloud pattern, but the thunderstorm activity was weakening, typical of most Pacific hurricanes that reach cooler waters. The weakening briefly stopped after Douglas went through an eyewall replacement cycle, but Douglas was downgraded to a tropical storm late on July 24 as the storm only had a small area of deep convection left. Tropical storm Douglas briefly stopped weakening as convection increased, only to fade away again hours later. The storm was downgraded to a tropical depression early on July 26, and later that day degenerated into a remnant low-pressure area. The remnant low dissipated the next day.

Hurricane Elida 

A tropical wave generated into Tropical Depression Six-E on July 23. It moved westward and reached storm strength 12 hours after it formed. Elida rapidly deepened, developing a pinhole eye, and becoming a hurricane on July 24 and further reaching major hurricane intensity six hours later. Elida's rapid intensification continued, becoming a Category 5 hurricane for six hours on July 25.

Despite moving over warm waters, Elida began to weaken because it began an eyewall replacement cycle. When the cycle ended, the cyclone was over cooler water and unsteadily weakened. Elida fell to a tropical storm on July 27, then degenerated into a remnant low and turned to the northeast.

Elida is one of the fastest intensifying eastern Pacific hurricanes. Its rate of intensification is rivaled only by 1997's Linda, 2015's Patricia, and 2018's Norman. Elida had no direct impact on land. However, it did send heavy waves along the shores of Mexico. No one was killed and no damage was reported.

Tropical Depression Seven-E 

A tropical wave that had reached the Eastern Pacific from Africa was first spotted on July 23. The wave continued westward with little development occurring until August 3, when convection increased. After additional slow organization, the wave was classified as Tropical Depression Seven-E on August 6 near the tip of Baja California. The system did not strengthen much, and development was halted when wind shear destroyed the system on August 8. The depression never came near land and hence no one was killed or injured. Like Tropical Depression Three-E, this cyclone was forecast to reach tropical storm intensity, but it never did.

Hurricane Fausto 

After a rather lengthy lull punctuated by only Tropical Depression Seven-E, a tropical wave formed Tropical Depression Eight-E on August 21. Initially taking a westward track, the depression strengthened into Tropical Storm Fausto on August 22. It turned to the west-northwest and stayed on that path for the next six days. Fausto steadily strengthened and intensified into a hurricane on August 22. It continued to intensify, peaking as a Category 4 on August 24, and also substantially increased in size. The hurricane began to weaken thereafter, and was a minimal tropical storm by the time it entered the Central Pacific Hurricane Center's area of responsibility on August 27. The tropical cyclone dropped to a depression and degenerated into a non-convective swirl of clouds on August 28.

Fausto's remnants passed north of the Hawaiian Islands uneventfully until they interacted with a tropical upper-tropospheric trough (TUTT) on August 30. In combination with warm waters, a tropical depression with some subtropical features developed. At this time it was located around latitude 30°N. By September 1, Fausto had redeveloped into a tiny but tropical ministorm. Its rebirth was brief, however, as a mid-latitude cyclone absorbed the system early on September 3.

Fausto's regeneration north of Hawaii was unusual but not unprecedented. The other time this happened since 1966 was in the 1975 season. That time, another TUTT absorbed the remnant of Hurricane Ilsa, which led to the formation of an unnamed hurricane at high latitude. Other tropical cyclones have strengthened north of Hawaii, but the actual formation of one is rare.

Tropical Storm Alika 

An area of convection acquired a closed circulation and became Tropical Depression One-C on August 22. It stayed disorganized for the next several days. It organized more fully and intensified into a tropical storm on August 25 and was named Alika. After peaking as a moderately strong tropical storm on August 25, wind shear caused by the pre-Ele tropical depression and an upper-level low near Hawaii weakened the storm to a depression on August 27. Alika dissipated the next day, having never threatened land.

Tropical Storm Genevieve 

A tropical wave formed Tropical Depression Nine-E on August 26. It was upgraded to a tropical storm and named Genevieve the next day. It moved westward and nearly strengthened to a hurricane, peaking in intensity on August 28. At that point, the cyclone encountered cooler waters, which caused it to weaken slowly, weakening to a depression on August 30. The depression hung on until it lost convection on the September 2. A swirl of remnant clouds persisted for a few more days. Genevieve had no impact on land, with no reports of casualties or damage being received by the National Hurricane Center.

Hurricane Ele 

An eastern extension of the monsoon trough south of Hawaii organized into Tropical Depression Two-C on August 27 and strengthened into Tropical Storm Ele six hours later. Despite the nearby presence of Alika, Ele developed rapidly and strengthened into a hurricane on August 28. After contributing to the dissipation of Alika, Ele continued intensifying. It reached Category 2 intensity late on August 28 and quickly became a major hurricane six hours later. The hurricane then crossed the International Date Line and became a typhoon in the 2002 Pacific typhoon season. Typhoon Ele turned to the northwest after crossing the dateline and continued to strengthen. It reached Category 4 before turning north and weakening again. After briefly restrengthening back into a Category 4, the typhoon weakened and turned to the northwest. Ele was downgraded to a tropical storm on September 7, a depression on September 9, and then dissipated shortly afterwards. Ele did not affect land.

Hurricane Hernan 

A weak wave in the ITCZ organized into Tropical Depression Ten-E on August 30. It headed west-northwest and quickly intensified into a tropical storm and eventually, a hurricane. Hernan then began rapidly deepening, reaching Category 5 intensity on September 1. It maintained that intensity for 12 hours before tracking over cooler waters. The storm weakened steadily, with wind shear contributing to its deterioration. Hernan then degenerated into a remnant low on September 6. The low turned to the southwest and dissipated three days later.

Hernan passed close enough to Socorro Island to bring strong winds to the island. Other than the aforementioned regions, Hernan had no significant impact on land.

Tropical Depression Eleven-E 

Of the four tropical depressions this season that did not become named storms, only Eleven-E threatened land. An area of disturbed weather associated with a tropical wave formed into a tropical cyclone on September 5. It tracked northwestward, before turning southwest. It weakened into a remnant low on September 8. The remnant turned north and dissipated on September 10 offshore of the Baja California peninsula. The cyclone was nearly a tropical storm when it peaked on September 6. It was forecast to become a tropical storm and pass close to the peninsula. This prompted a tropical storm warning and a hurricane watch. With the weakening of the cyclone the watch and warning were discontinued. No damage or casualties were reported in association with this tropical cyclone.

Tropical Storm Iselle 

Part of the same tropical wave that formed Tropical Depression Seven in the Atlantic basin organized into Tropical Depression Twelve-E on September 15. It strengthened further into Tropical Storm Iselle the next day. The storm headed northwest and paralleled the coast of Mexico, nearly strengthening into a hurricane late on September 17. While near its peak intensity, a trough abruptly recurved the system to the northeast. Wind shear also increased, and Iselle consequently fell apart on satellite imagery. It weakened to a depression on September 19. Iselle then degenerated into a remnant low the next day and rapidly degenerated, dissipating on September 20. Iselle never made landfall.

Iselle threatened parts of southwestern Mexico and warnings and watches were issued for that area. Heavy rains were reported over parts of the Baja California Peninsula. There were no reports of damage or casualties.

Tropical Storm Julio 

An area of convection and disturbed weather, possibly related to outflow from Hurricane Isidore in the Atlantic basin, developed a circulation on September 23 and organized into Tropical Depression Thirteen-E on September 25. The depression headed northward and strengthened into a tropical storm that same day. Julio turned to the northwest and peaked in intensity as a minimal tropical storm near Lázaro Cárdenas, Michoacán. On September 26, Julio made landfall. The storm rapidly dissipated over Mexico.

Three fatalities were reported from Julio. However, in Guerrero, around 100 houses in Acapulco and Zihuatanejo were damaged or washed away by flash flooding.

Hurricane Kenna 

A disturbance possibly associated with a tropical wave organized into Tropical Depression Fourteen-E on October 22. It strengthened into a tropical storm that same day and a hurricane on October 23. The next day, Kenna became the third Category 5 hurricane of the season. A trough over Mexico recurved the hurricane, and it started accelerating towards Mexico. Despite moving over waters that were still warm, wind shear weakened the system to a minimal Category 4 by the time of its landfall over Mexico late on October 25. Mountainous terrain rapidly weakened Kenna, and the system dissipated early on October 26.

Hurricane Kenna was the third-strongest Pacific hurricane to make landfall on record. It was also the second-strongest October hurricane in any season, and the third strongest Pacific hurricane overall. In San Blas, Nayarit, 8,800 people were affected; 1,540 houses were damaged or destroyed, which was 80% to 90% of houses in the town. In Santiago Ixcuintla, 3,770 houses were damaged. Agriculture in the affected area was disrupted. Farmers required aid, and many fruit crops were destroyed. Tourism in Puerto Vallarta was disrupted, with much of the damage to hotels. Insurance companies reported that Kenna's total damage was $96 million (2002 USD).

Kenna killed four people in Mexico and injured over a hundred. The low death toll is likely due to massive evacuations in San Blas, Nayarit, and elsewhere ahead of the hurricane.

Tropical Storm Lowell 

A weak tropical wave located over the open Pacific Ocean organized into Tropical Depression Fifteen-E on October 22. It strengthened into a tropical storm the next day. Shortly afterwards, wind shear increased. Lowell's convection was disrupted, and its center of circulation became exposed. The cyclone crossed into the Central Pacific Hurricane Center's area of responsibility on October 26. The shear relaxed, and the depression restrengthened into a tropical storm. Lowell drifted in slow steering currents until it approached Hurricane Huko. The proximity of Huko caused a gradual weakening in Lowell, and it dissipated on October 31.

Hurricane Huko 
In late October, an active monsoon trough persisted south of Hawaii along 10°N latitude, developing an area of convection on October 24. Initially poorly organized, it moved to the north and steadily intensified, becoming Tropical Storm Huko early on October 26 while turning northwestward. Late on October 28, Huko reached hurricane strength, but its close proximity to Tropical Storm Lowell and a brief increase in wind shear weakened it back to a tropical storm on October 30. On November 2, a ridge caused the hurricane to accelerate, and the next day it crossed the International Date Line into the Western Pacific, becoming a typhoon.

The remnants of Huko later reentered the basin, eventually affecting California. The system was responsible for heavy rains, causing flooding along a small stream in Bakersfield. Total damage was approximately $23,000 (2002 USD).

Tropical Depression Sixteen-E 

Tropical Depression Sixteen-E formed from a disturbance in the Intertropical Convergence Zone. Despite being located in a hostile environment, it managed to organize into a tropical depression on November 14. It was briefly forecast to strengthen into a tropical storm. However, wind shear prevented that from occurring. Consequently, the depression degenerated into a remnant low on November 16 and dissipated soon after that.

Other systems 
An upper-level low to the northeast provided outflow, and the Joint Typhoon Warning Center issued a Tropical Cyclone Formation Alert early on July 19. Although not classified by the CPHC, the Japan Meteorological Agency (JMA) remarked that a tropical depression had developed by early on July 20, just east of the International Date Line. Soon after, it crossed into the western Pacific and briefly intensified into Tropical Storm Kalmaegi. Also on October 30, the JMA indicated that Tropical Storm Maysak moved into the basin and became extratropical few hours later.

Storm names 

The following names were used for named storms that form in the northeastern Pacific Ocean during 2002. Retired names, if any, will be announced by the World Meteorological Organization during the 25th session of the RA IV Hurricane Committee in the spring of 2003. The names not retired from this list will be used again in the 2008 season. This was the same list used in the 1996 season.

For storms that form in the Central Pacific Hurricane Center's area of responsibility, encompassing the area between 140 degrees west and the International Date Line, all names are used in a series of four rotating lists. The next four names that were slated for use in 2002 are shown below, though only three of them were used during the season.

Retirement 

On March 31, 2003, at the 25th session of the RA IV hurricane committee, the World Meteorological Organization retired the name Kenna from its rotating name lists due to the deaths and damages it caused, and it will not be used again for another Pacific hurricane. Kenna was replaced with Karina for the 2008 Pacific hurricane season.

Season effects 
This is a table of all the storms that formed in the 2002 Pacific hurricane season. It includes their duration, names, intensities, areas affected, damages, and death totals. Deaths in parentheses are additional and indirect (an example of an indirect death would be a traffic accident), but were still related to that storm. Damage and deaths include totals while the storm was extratropical, a wave, or a low, and all the damage figures are in 2002 USD.

See also 

 Tropical cyclones in 2002
 List of Pacific hurricanes
 Pacific hurricane season
 2002 Atlantic hurricane season
 2002 Pacific typhoon season
 2002 North Indian Ocean cyclone season
 South-West Indian Ocean cyclone seasons: 2001–02, 2002–03
 Australian region cyclone seasons: 2001–02, 2002–03
 South Pacific cyclone seasons: 2001–02, 2002–03

References

External links 

 National Hurricane Center Website
 National Hurricane Center's Eastern Pacific Tropical Weather Outlook
 Servicio Meteorológico Nacional Website 
 Joint Typhoon Warning Center 
 NHC 2002 Pacific hurricane season archive
 CPHC 2002 season archive
 HPC 2002 Tropical Cyclone Rainfall Pages
 Unisys archive

 
Pacific hurricane seasons
2002 EPac